Frosta is the smallest municipality in Trøndelag county, Norway. The administrative centre is the village of Frosta. The municipality is located along the Trondheimsfjord, on the Frosta peninsula, just north of the city of Trondheim. It also includes the island of Tautra which is connected to the mainland by a causeway bridge.

The  municipality is the 337th largest by area out of the 356 municipalities in Norway. Frosta is the 245th most populous municipality in Norway with a population of 2,608.

General information
Frosta was established as a municipality on 1 January 1838 (see formannskapsdistrikt law). It is one of very few municipalities in Norway with unchanged borders since that date.  In 2018, the municipality, which was part of the old Nord-Trøndelag county became part of the new Trøndelag county.

Name
The municipality (originally the parish) is named Frosta. The meaning of the name is unknown. Historically, the name was also spelled Frosten.

Coat of arms
The coat of arms was granted on 26 June 1987. The official blazon is "Vert, a sceptre fleury Or". This means the arms have a green field (background) and the charge is a sceptre or mace with a Fleur-de-lis design at the top. The charge has a tincture of Or which means it is commonly colored yellow, but if it is made out of metal, then gold is used. The coat of arms was inspired by the old seal of the medieval Frostating assembly, where King Magnus VI the law-mender is sitting with a lily sceptre in his hand. Frosta was one of the historic places of justice, so this was chosen to commemorate that fact. The arms were designed by Einar H. Skjervold.

Churches
The Church of Norway has one parish within the municipality of Frosta. It is part of the Sør-Innherad prosti (deanery) in the Diocese of Nidaros.

History

Several rock engraving sites can be found in the parish, together with burial mounds from Viking times. Archaeologists have for the first time found the remnants of a Viking harbour (Vikinghavna på Fånestangen) in Norway at Frosta. A number of logs sticking up along the shoreline at Frosta have been dated back to around year 1000.

Norway's oldest court, Frostating, had its seat here at Tinghaugen, close to the medieval church at Logtun. On the island of Tautra can be found the remains of Tautra Abbey, a Trappist (Reformed Cistercian) convent, established in 1207.

Economy
Agriculture makes up the largest business in Frosta, which is sometimes called "Trondheim's kitchen garden" due to the substantial production of vegetables, strawberries, and flowers.

Geography

By road the distance is about  Frosta is sometimes nicknamed "Trondheim's kitchen garden" due to many farms with production of vegetables, as well as a good microclimate.

Climate
Frosta has a predominantly temperate oceanic climate/marine west coast climate (barely humid continental if 0 °C is used as winter threshold). The driest month is May and the wettest is December. The all-time high temperature is  recorded July 2019; the all-time low is  recorded in February 2010. The warmest month on record was July 2014 with average high , average low  and mean . The coldest month on record was December 2010 with average high , average low  and mean . The weather station was established in December 1989.

Government
All municipalities in Norway, including Frosta, are responsible for primary education (through 10th grade), outpatient health services, senior citizen services, unemployment and other social services, zoning, economic development, and municipal roads. The municipality is governed by a municipal council of elected representatives, which in turn elect a mayor.  The municipality falls under the Trøndelag District Court and the Frostating Court of Appeal.

Municipal council
The municipal council of Frosta is made up of 17 representatives that are elected to four year terms. The party breakdown of the council is as follows:

Mayor
The mayors of Frosta:

1838–1842: Isak Jørgen Coldevin 	
1843–1845: Rasmus Stene 	
1846–1849: Haagen Einersen	
1850–1853: Aage Hagerup 	
1854–1857: Haagen Einersen	
1858–1861: Henning Wedege 	
1862–1863: Aage Hagerup 	
1864–1865: Haagen Einersen  	
1866–1869: Arnt Peter Island 	
1870–1871: Johan Peter Qvarme  	
1872–1873: Hans Juberg 	
1874–1885: Arnt Peter Island  	
1886–1889: Hans Juberg (V)
1890–1891: Hans Faanes (V)
1892–1897: Lars Flegstad (V)
1898–1913: Andreas Galtvik (V)
1914–1916: Haakon Rochseth (Riksmålspartiet)
1917–1919: Andreas Galtvik (V)
1920–1922: Haakon Rochseth (Riksmålspartiet)
1923–1925: Andreas Galtvik (V)
1926–1931: Ole Andreas Aursand (V)
1932–1940: Asbjørn Hogstad (V)
1941–1945: Bjarne Rokseth (NS)
1945-1945: Asbjørn Hogstad (Bp)
1945–1947: Kristian Rangnes (Ap)
1948–1951: Asbjørn Hogstad (Bp)
1952–1955: Lars Viken (Bp)
1956–1961: Erling Wollan (Ap)
1962–1963: Johan Petter Skogseth (Sp)
1964–1967: Erling Wollan (Ap)
1968–1969: Gunnar Stenhaug (Ap)
1970–1971: Bjarne Sundfær (H)
1972–1975: Erling Wollan (Ap)
1976–1991: Karl Viken (Sp)
1992–1999: Jens Hagerup (Sp)
1999-2003: Boje Reitan (Sp)
2003-2009: Lars Myraune (H)
2009-2011: Frode Revhaug (H)
2011-2015: Johan Petter Skogseth (Sp)
2015-2019: Trine Haug (Sp)
2019–present: Frode Revhaug (H)

Notable residents

 Lars Myraune (born 1944 in Frosta), a military leader, politician and Mayor of Frosta 2003–2009
 Karin Pettersen (born 1964 in Frosta), a team handball player and team silver medalist at the 1988 Summer Olympics and 1992 Summer Olympics
 Vidar Riseth (born 1972 in Frosta), a former football player with over 400 club caps and 52 for Norway
 Anna Ceselie Brustad Moe (born 1975), a politician for the Centre Party

References

External links

Municipal fact sheet from Statistics Norway 
Turist information 
Local newspaper 
Tautra Cistercian abbey
Municipal main page 
The international Frosta festival 
Hauganfjæra Camping 

 
Municipalities of Trøndelag
1838 establishments in Norway